Lore is a podcast created by Aaron Mahnke. Mahnke uploaded the first episode of the podcast in early 2015. Each episode is a retelling of urban legends, myths, and documented tragic events.

References

Lore
Horror podcasts